The Spata family was an Albanian noble family active in the 14th, 15th and 16th centuries, initially as Venetian vassals and later as Ottoman vassals. The family's progenitors were the brothers John Spata and Sgouros Spata. Shpata means "sword" in Albanian.

In the first half of the 14th century, mercenaries, raiders and migrants known in Greek as Άλβανοί (Albanoi or "Albanians") flooded into Greece (specifically raiding Thessaly in 1325 and 1334). In 1358, Albanians overran the regions of Epirus, Acarnania and Aetolia and established two principalities under their leaders, John Spata and Peter Losha. Naupactus (Lepanto) was later taken in 1378. The Spata family frequently collaborated with the Ottomans and saw them as protectors.

Although German historian Karl Hopf provided a genealogy of the Spata family, it is deemed by modern scholarship as "altogether inaccurate".

John Spata, recognized as a ruler in Epirus and Aetolia by Simeon Uroš in 1359–1360.
Eirene Spata who married Esau de' Buondelmonti, the Despot of Ioannina, in 1396.
An unnamed daughter who married John Zenevisi.
Unclear
Maurice Spata ( 1399–1414)
Yaqub Spata ( 1414–1416)
Sgouros Spata ( 1399–d. 1403)
Paul Spata, Ottoman vassal

The Spata family was not kin (blood relatives) with the later Bua family.

References

Citations

Sources